The Payne Fund Studies were a series of studies conducted to determine the effects of movies on the behavior of children and adolescents. They were paid for by The Payne Fund, a private foundation, and performed in the late 1920s and early 1930s. They have been criticized as lacking scientific rigor but were the first attempt to rigorously study the media. They were politically significant and were instrumental in the enforcement of the Hays Code. They are credited with contributing to the demise of Pre-Code film-making in Hollywood.

Reception
Newspapers including Cleveland's The Plain Dealer, New Orleans Times Picayune, Chicago Daily News, Atlanta Journal, Saint Paul Dispatch, the Philadelphia Record and Public Ledger, the Boston American and New York's Daily News, Daily Mirror, and Evening Post all lambasted the studies.

References

Sources
Black, Gregory D. Hollywood Censored: Morality Codes, Catholics, and the Movies. Cambridge University Press (1996); 
Rodman, George, Mass Media in a Changing World: History, Industry, Controversy, 2nd ed., McGraw Hill;

External links
Payne Fund studies summary

Psychological testing
Film organizations in the United States